Gundar or Gündar may refer to:

People
Ayelet Gundar-Goshen (born 1982), Israeli author
Esra Gündar (born 1980), Turkish female handballer

Places
Gundar River, river flowing in the Virudhunagar and Tirunelveli districts of the Indian state of Tamil Nadu
Upper Gundar River, river flowing in the Sivagangai district of the Indian state of Tamil Nadu
Gundar Dam, dam located near the Sengottai city, Tenkasi, Tamil Nadu, India.

See also
Gundars, a given name